Villella is a surname. Notable people with the surname include:

Ann Villella, American voice actress
Chad Villella (born 1977), American actor, writer, producer, and director
Davide Villella (born 1991), Italian cyclist
Edward Villella (born 1936), American ballet dancer and choreographer